Ergersheim is a commune in the Bas-Rhin department in Grand Est in north-eastern France.

Places to see
 Saint Michel Chapel
 Saint Nicolas Church

Twin towns
 Ergersheim, in Germany

See also
 Communes of the Bas-Rhin department

References

External links

  Official Web site 

Communes of Bas-Rhin
Bas-Rhin communes articles needing translation from French Wikipedia